Tropical disturbances and tropical depressions are the two lowest classifications on the South Pacific version of the Australian scale. Over the years, 178 South Pacific tropical cyclones have failed to organize into Category 1 tropical cyclones, the most recent being Tropical Disturbance 08F (2020).

Background
The South Pacific tropical cyclone basin is located to the south of the Equator between 160°E and 120°W. The basin is officially monitored by the Fiji Meteorological Service and the New Zealand MetService, while other meteorological services such as the Australian Bureau of Meteorology, Météo-France as well as the United States Joint Typhoon Warning Center also monitor the basin. Within the region a tropical disturbance is classified as a non-frontal system that originates over the tropics and either has enhanced atmospheric convection or some indications of cyclonic wind circulation. A tropical disturbance is subsequently classified as a tropical depression or a tropical low, when there is a clearly defined circulation and the maximum 10-minute average wind speed is less than  near the centre.

Systems

Other systems
Tropical Cyclone Raquel (2014) developed into a Category 1 tropical cyclone, as it moved out of the region and into the Australian Region.

See also
List of Category 1 Atlantic hurricanes
List of Category 1 Pacific hurricanes

Notes

References

External links

South Pacific tropical depressions
SPAC 0